Body privilege or pretty privilege is a concept used to examine the economic, social, and political advantages or benefits that are made to both men and women solely based on their physical appearance. A common example of the "ideal" body type set by Western standards is thin, tall, and muscular. Academic ideas such as the halo effect can be used to explain body privilege, describing the phenomenon of attractive people being perceived as good people based on their appearance.

Overview 
Body privilege is a relatively new concept. The term was borrowed from Peggy McIntosh's idea of white privilege and evolved into the idea that privilege could also be based on a person's body size. Samantha Kwan coined the term "body privilege" and explains how it affects some people's everyday life. For example, in some cases a person's body is seen as an indicator of a person's intelligence. A person's body can also be a deciding factor on employment decisions such as hiring and promoting. However, some may say that privilege may only apply in unchangeable circumstances, such as race or gender, and not in cases that are under the control of the influenced. For this reason, the very idea of body privilege remains debated.

See also
 Lookism

References

Notes 
 DeFrancisco, V.P., Palczewski, C.H. & McGeough, D.D. (2014). Gender in Communication: A critical introduction. Thousand Oaks, CA: SAGE Publications, Inc.
 Kwan, S. (2010). Navigating public spaces: Gender, race, and body privilege in everyday life. Feminist Formations, 22(2), 144–166.
 Van Amsterdam, N. (2013). Big fat inequalities, thin privilege: An intersectional perspective on 'body size'. European Journal of Woman's Studies. May 2013 (20) 155–169. doi:10.1177/1350506812456461.

Social privilege